Chandroda is a village  from the town of Anjar, in the taluka of Kutch district, Gujarat, India. It has a population of around 2500.

There is a primary and a secondary school in Chandroda.

References 

Villages in Kutch district